Count Eric Stanislaus (or Stanislaus Eric) Stenbock ( at Thirlestaine Hall (Cheltenham) –  at Withdeane Hall in Brighton) was a Baltic Swedish poet and writer of macabre fantastic fiction.

Life
Stenbock was the count of Bogesund and the heir to an estate near Kolga in Estonia.  He was the son of Lucy Sophia Frerichs, the daughter and heiress of Johann Andreas Frerichs, a Manchester cotton tycoon, and Count Erich Stenbock, of a distinguished Swedish noble family of the Baltic German House of nobility in Reval. The family rose to prominence in the service of King Gustav Vasa: Catherine Stenbock was the third and last consort of Gustav Vasa and Queen consort of Sweden between 1552 and 1560. Stenbock's great-grandfather was Baron Friedrich von Stuart (1761–1842) from Courland. Immanuel Kant was a great-great-granduncle of Stenbock.

Stenbock's father died suddenly while he was one year old; his properties were held in trust for him by his grandfather Magnus. Eric's maternal grandfather died while Eric was quite young, also, in 1866, leaving him another trust fund.

Stenbock attended Balliol College in Oxford but never completed his studies.  While at Oxford, Eric was deeply influenced by the homosexual Pre-Raphaelite artist and illustrator Simeon Solomon. He is also said to have had a relationship with the composer and conductor Norman O'Neill and with other "young men".

In Oxford, Stenbock also converted to Roman Catholicism taking for himself the name Stanislaus. Some years later Eric also admitted to having tried a different religion every week in Oxford. At the end of his life, he seemed to have developed a syncretist religion containing elements of Catholicism, Buddhism and idolatry.

In 1885, Count Magnus died, upon which Stenbock, as the oldest living male relative, acceded to the status of Count and to the possession of the family's estates in Estonia.  Eric traveled to and lived in Kolga for a year and a half; he returned to England in the summer of 1887, during which time he sank deeper into alcoholism and drug addiction.

Stenbock behaved eccentrically.  He kept snakes, lizards, salamanders and toads in his room, and had a "zoo" in his garden containing a reindeer, a fox, and a bear. When he traveled, he invariably brought with him a dog, a monkey, and a life-sized doll.  This doll he referred to as "le Petit Comte" ("the little Count") and told everyone that it was his son; he insisted it be brought to him daily, and—when it was absent—he asked about its health. (Stenbock's family believed an unscrupulous Jesuit had been given large amounts of money by the Count for the "education" of this doll.)

Work
Stenbock lived in England most of his life, and wrote his works in the English language.  He published a number of books of verse during his lifetime, including Love, Sleep, and Dreams, 1881, and Rue, Myrtle, and Cypress (1883).  In 1894, Stenbock published The Shadow of Death, his last volume of verse, and Studies of Death, a collection of short stories.

Death
On 26 April 1895 Stenbock died from cirrhosis of the liver at his mother's home, Withdeane Hall, near Brighton; his death went unnoticed in the press, aside from a brief mention in The Times (30 April 1895). Stenbock had named More Adey as his literary executor. On 1 May the burial service was held in the Brighton Extra Mural Cemetery.

Legacy
The band Current 93 made an album of the same name of incidental music inspired by Stenbock's Faust story. Stenbock's legacy is supported by the invitation-only Stenbock Society, notable like Stenbock himself for its infrequent activity.

Marc Almond and Michael Cashmore released the two-track CD Gabriel & The Lunatic Lover in 2008 with two songs based on Stenbock's poems by the same name. This was followed in 2011 by the album Feasting with Panthers which included two more adaptations, "Sonnet XI" and "The Song of the Unwept Tear". All four poems were adapted and translated by Jeremy Reed.

Strange Attractor Press published a collection of Stenbock's short stories, poems, and essays, Of Kings and Things in 2019.

Works

Poetry
 Love, sleep & dreams : a volume of verse. - Oxford : A. Thomas Shrimpton & Son ; Simpkin Marshall & Co, 1881?
 Myrtle, rue and cypress : a book of poems, songs and sonnets. - London : [privately printed by] Hatchards, 1883
 The shadow of death : poems, songs, and sonnets. - London : The Leadenhall Press, 1893

Short story collections
 Studies of death : romantic tales (London : David Nutt, 1894)

Biographies and other
 Adlard, John. Stenbock, Yeats and the Nineties ; with an hitherto unpublished essay on Stenbock by Arthur Symons and a bibliography by Timothy d'Arch Smith. - London :  Cecil & Amelia Woolf, 1969
 Costelloe, Mary. Christmas with Count Stenbock / [edited by] John Adlard ; frontispiece by Max Beerbohm. -London : Enitharmon, 1980. - Contains letters by Mary Costelloe
 Reed, Jeremy. A hundred years of disappearance : Count Eric Stenbock. - [Great Britain? : J. Reed, 1995]

References

External links
A Secret Kept: A Brief Life of Count Stenbock
Gay and lesbian preservationists' concern for Count Stenbock's grave  in Brighton, England
Kolga; contains a picture of the Stenbock ancestral estate in Estonia
"The Other Side: A Breton Legend" (full text)
 
Eric Stenbock as a main character in the fiction at The Criterion, June 2017 (full text)

1860 births
1895 deaths
Deaths from cirrhosis
German gay writers
People from the Governorate of Estonia
19th-century Estonian poets
Estonian male poets
Baltic-German people
Estonian nobility
Alumni of Balliol College, Oxford
Accidental deaths in England
German male poets
19th-century German poets
19th-century German male writers
Alcohol-related deaths in England
Weird fiction writers